Éric Altmayer (born 8 September 1962) and Nicolas Altmayer (born 26 January 1965) are French film producers. They are the founders of the Paris-based production company Mandarin Cinéma (also known as Mandarin Films).

Selected filmography 
 1996 : XY
 1997 : Grève party
 2000 : Jet Set 
 2001 : 3 Zéros
 2002 : Riders
 2002 : Dina
 2004 : People
 2005 : Sky Fighters
 2005 : Brice de Nice
 2005 : Ma vie en l'air
 2006 : OSS 117: Cairo, Nest of Spies
 2006 : On va s'aimer
 2007 : Hellphone
 2007 : Le Nouveau Protocole
 2008 : The First Day of the Rest of Your Life
 2008 : La Possibilité d'une île
 2008 : L'Empereur de la nuit
 2008 : Another Kind of Silence
 2009 : OSS 117: Lost in Rio
 2011 : A Happy Event
 2011 : The Conquest
 2012 : In the House
 2013 : Young & Beautiful
 2013 : Paris à tout prix
 2013 : Le grand méchant loup
 2013 : Fastlife
 2014 : Saint Laurent
 2014 : The New Girlfriend
 2014 : Maestro
 2015 : En équilibre
 2015 : The Student and Mister Henri
 2016 : Agnus Dei
 2016 : Chocolat
 2016 : Pattaya
 2016 : Frantz
 2016 : Brice 3
 2017 : Patients
 2017 : Jour J
 2017 : L'amant double
 2017 : Jalouse
 2019 : By the Grace of God
 2019 : The Mystery of Henri Pick
 2019 : Blanche neige
 2019 : Venise n'est pas en Italie
 2020: Eté 84
 2021: Everything Went Fine
 2021: OSS 117: From Africa with Love
 2022: Tower of Strength

External links 

French film producers
1962 births
1965 births
Sibling duos
Sibling filmmakers
Living people